Amor Descarado (Barefaced Love) is a telenovela produced by RTI Producciones and Spanish-language United States-based television network Telemundo, this is a US Hispanic version of Chilean telenovela Amores de Mercado. It was broadcast by Telemundo on September 8, 2003 and ended on March 19, 2004. This telenovela was aired in 8 countries around the world.

Cast

 José Ángel Llamas as Pedro 'Pelluco' Solís / Rodolfo Fuentemayor
 Bárbara Mori as Fernanda Lira
 Ivonne Montero as Betsabe Galdames
 Víctor González as Ignacio Valdez. Main villain. Ends in jail, because tried to kill Rodolfo
 Roberto Ahumada Murillo as Martin Lira
 Isela Vega as Nora
 Lupita Ferrer as Morgana Atal. Villain. Stays alone.
 José Bardina as Mr. Clinton
 Gabriela Roel as Matilde García
 Veranetthe Lozano as Elena Rivas "Chamoyada"
 Riccardo Dalmacci as Epigmenio "Chamoy" Solís. Villain. Goes to jail
 Roberto Moll as Camilo Fuentemayor
 Joaquín Garrido as Eliodoro Galdames
 Mara Croatto as Chantal Burgos
 Jeannette Lehr as Pastora Alicia Rubilar
 Virna Flores as Jennifer Rebolledo
 José Luis Franco as Guadalupe “Lupe”
 Paulo César Quevedo as Jonathan Muñoz
 Verónica Terán as Mónica Peralta
 Pedro Moreno as Rubén García
 Mónica Guzmán as Esmeralda Peralta
 Silvana Arias as Constanza 'Coni' Valdez
 Mariana Huerdo as Topacio Peralta
 Kenya Hijuelos as Yesenia Solís
 Melvin Cabrera as Abel Galdames Rubilar
 Christian Tapán as Basilio Concha
 Laura Termini as Miryam
 Alexa Kuve as Ivonne Altamira
 Roberto Levermann as Homero Silva
 Carla Rodríguez as Vicky
 Josué Gutierrez as Bernardo
 Gladys Cáceres as Corina
 Adrián Mas as Dino
 Rolando Tarajano as Ciego Ahumada
 Sabas Malaver as Poncio
 Chao as Pérez Peña
 Gabriel Parisi as Gustavo
 Sergio March as Jose Maria
 Juan Marquez as Bartender
 Elka Peterson as Store Clerk

External links
 

2003 telenovelas
2004 telenovelas
2003 American television series debuts
2004 American television series endings
2003 Colombian television series debuts
2004 Colombian television series endings
Colombian telenovelas
RTI Producciones telenovelas
Spanish-language American telenovelas
Telemundo telenovelas
American television series based on Chilean television series
American television series based on telenovelas